Thomas R. Chiola (born March 18, 1952) served as a judge of the Illinois Circuit Court of Cook County from 1994 to 2009.  He was the first openly gay person elected to public office in Illinois.

Early life and education
Chiola grew up in Springfield, Illinois.  He graduated from Springfield's Griffin High School (now Sacred Heart-Griffin High School) in 1970. Chiola then received a Bachelor of Science from Illinois State University in 1974 and a Juris Doctor from the University of Illinois College of Law in 1977. He served as an administrative law judge. He also served as general counsel of the Illinois Department of Professional Regulation.

Judicial service
In 1994, Chiola was elected to the Illinois Circuit Court of Cook County.  Chiola was the first openly gay candidate elected to any federal, state, county or municipal office in Illinois.

Honors
In 1997, Chiola was inducted into the Chicago Gay and Lesbian Hall of Fame.

See also
 List of first minority male lawyers and judges in Illinois
 List of LGBT jurists in the United States

References

1952 births
Living people
Illinois State University alumni
University of Illinois College of Law alumni
LGBT appointed officials in the United States
LGBT judges
LGBT people from Illinois
Judges of the Circuit Court of Cook County
People from Springfield, Illinois
American gay men